Joseph Allen ( – ) was an American Congregational clergyman.  He was the father of authors Joseph Henry Allen and William Francis Allen. 

He graduated from Harvard in 1811, and was ordained pastor of the Congregational church at Northborough in 1816, which relation he sustained until his death. He was a delegate to the International Peace Congress of Paris in 1849. His published works include Historical Account of Northborough (1826), History of the Worcester Association (1868), and Allen Genealogy (1869), besides sermons, text-books, and Sunday-school books.

References

External links 
 https://www.harvardsquarelibrary.org/biographies/joseph-allen-1790-1873/ 

Created via preloaddraft
1790 births
1873 deaths
Harvard College alumni
19th-century American clergy
American Congregationalist ministers